Charles III of Alençon (1337 – 5 July 1375, Lyon) was the eldest son of Charles II of Alençon and Maria de la Cerda.

He succeeded his father as Count of Alençon in 1346, but resigned the county to his brother Peter II of Alençon in 1361 to take up an ecclesiastical career.

On 13 July 1365, Charles was made Archbishop of Lyon. As archbishop, he firmly resisted royal encroachment on his rights as Primate of France. By 1366, he was patronizing a circle of scholars including, Nicholas de Mesereyo.

References

Sources

1337 births
1375 deaths
House of Valois-Alençon
Counts of Alençon
Archbishops of Lyon
14th-century Roman Catholic archbishops in France
14th-century peers of France